Ori Station is a subway station on the Bundang Line. Prior to the opening of Bojeong Station in 2004, it was the southern terminus of the Bundang Line. It is the first underground railway station built in Korea to have two island platforms and four rail tracks.

Seoul Metropolitan Subway stations
Bundang
Metro stations in Seongnam
Railway stations opened in 1994